North Dakota Highway 45 (ND 45) is a  north–south state highway in the U.S. state of North Dakota. ND 45's southern terminus is at ND 200 in Cooperstown, and the northern terminus is at ND 32 west of Sharon.

Major intersections

References

045
Transportation in Griggs County, North Dakota